32 Ophiuchi is a single star located 410 light years away from the Sun in the constellation Hercules. It is visible to the naked eye as a dim, red-hued star with an apparent visual magnitude of 4.97. This is an aging red giant star on the asymptotic giant branch with a stellar classification of M3−III. Having exhausted the supply of hydrogen at its core it has expanded to 60 times the girth of the Sun. The star is radiating 614 times the luminosity of the Sun from its swollen photosphere at an effective temperature of around 3,712 K. It is moving further away from the Sun with a heliocentric radial velocity of +43 km/s.

References

M-type giants
Suspected variables
Hercules (constellation)
Durchmusterung objects
Ophiuchi, 32
154143
083430
6337